Roi Ben-Ari is an Israeli international lawn bowler.

Bowls career
Ben-Ari was selected as part of the five man team by Israel for the 2012 World Outdoor Bowls Championship in Adelaide, Australia.

He won a fours bronze medal (with Yair Bekier, Colin Silberstein and Allan Saitowitz) at the 2011 Atlantic Bowls Championships.

References

Israeli male bowls players
Living people
Year of birth missing (living people)